

1975

See also 
 1975 in Australia
 1975 in Australian television

References

External links 
 Australian film at the Internet Movie Database

1975
Lists of 1975 films by country or language
Films